Harold Dahl may refer to:
Harold Edward Dahl, Spanish Civil War fighter ace and World War II RCAF pilot trainer
Harold J. Dahl, American politician and judge
Harold Dahl (basketball), American basketball player
Harold Dahl, seaman involved in the Maury Island incident